This article lists the results for the Northern Ireland national football team between 1980 and 1999.

1980s

1980

1981

1982

1983

1984

1985

1986

1987

1988

1989

1990s

1990

1991

1992

1993

1994

1995

1996

1997

1998

1999

Notes

References

External links
RSSSF: (Northern) Ireland - International Results
British Home Championships 1967-1984
Northern Ireland Football Greats Archive
Northern Ireland Statistics and Records
England International Database From 1872
England Football Online
Scotland International Archive
Scotland Football Records Complete Record
Welsh Football Data Archive

1980-99
results
results
results
results
results
results
results
results
results
results
results
results
results
results
results
results
results
results
results
results
results